Imidazolidinones or imidazolinones are a class of 5-membered ring heterocycles structurally related to imidazole.  Imidazolidinones feature a saturated C3N2 nucleus, except for the presence of a urea or amide functional group in the 2 or 4 positions.

2-Imidazolidinones
The 2-imidazolidinones are cyclic derivatives of urea. 1,3-Dimethyl-2-imidazolidinone is a polar solvent and Lewis base.  Drugs featuring this ring system include emicerfont, imidapril, and azlocillin.  Dimethylol ethylene urea is the reagent used in permanent press clothing.

4-Imidazolidinones
4-Imidazolidinones can be prepared from phenylalanine in two chemical steps (amidation with methylamine followed by condensation reaction with acetone):

Imidazolidinone catalyst work by forming an iminium ion with carbonyl groups of α,β-unsaturated aldehydes (enals) and enones in a rapid chemical equilibrium. This iminium activation lower the substrate's LUMO.  Several 4-imidazolidinones have been investigated.  

Drugs featuring the 4-imidazolidinone ring include hetacillin, NNC 63-0532, spiperone, and spiroxatrine.

Imidazolones

Imidazolones (also called imidazolinones) are oxo derivatives of imidazoline (dihydroimidazoles).  Examples include imidazol-4-one-5-propionic acid, a product of the catabolism of histidine, and imazaquin, a member of the imidazolinone class of herbicide.

References